TCRE may refer to:
Transient climate response to cumulative carbon emissions, a measure of the response of the Earth's climate to CO2
Transcervical Resection of the Endometrium, a surgical procedure to remove part of the uterus